M code or M-Code may refer to:

 Machine code
 MATLAB programming language
 M-code, GPS signals for use by the military
 M Code, used in conjunction with G-code in the CNC/machining industry
 M Formula language, sometimes called M code, a mashup query language used in Microsoft's Power Query